Andrew Hammond Seliskar (born September 26, 1996) is a retired American competitive swimmer. He won the gold medal in the 200 meter butterfly at the 2013 FINA World Junior Swimming Championships in Dubai, breaking the Championships record.

Seliskar swam in college for the California Golden Bears at the University of California, Berkeley and currently swims for California Aquatics. Previously he attended Thomas Jefferson High School for Science and Technology in Virginia and swam for Nation’s Capital Swim Club. In 2015 he was named male High School Swimmer of the Year.

Career

2013
In December 2013, he won the gold medal in the 400 yard individual medley at the senior 2013 Winter National Championships. He also won silver medals in the 200 meter individual medley and the 200 meter butterfly.

2014
Seliskar broke the junior world record in the 200 meter butterfly (long course) at the 2014 junior Pan Pacific Championships. He won three individual gold medals at that meet, in the 200 meter butterfly (1:55.92), 200 meter individual medley (2:00.81), and the 400 meter individual medley (4:16.05), as well as a silver medal in the 100 meter butterfly (53.14). He also won a gold medal in the 4×200 meter freestyle relay, contributing a split time of 1:52.05 to the final time of 7:21.36.

2015
In 2015, Seliskar competed at the Summer Universiade in Gwangju, South Korea, and finished 8th in the 50-meter and 200-meter butterfly events.

2021

2020 US Olympic Trials
In June 2021, Seliskar qualified for the 2020 Olympic Games by placing 4th with a 1:46.34 in the 200 meter freestyle at the US Olympic Swimming Trials in Omaha, Nebraska.

2020 Summer Olympics

At the 2020 Summer Olympics in Tokyo, Japan, Seliskar competed in the prelims of the 4x200 meter freestyle relay along with Blake Pieroni, Patrick Callan, and Drew Kibler. Together they finished in fifth place and advanced the relay to the final. In the final, the relay finished fourth overall, not winning an Olympic medal.

2022: Retirement
In March 2022, SwimSwam and Swimming World conferred on Seliskar a permanent retirement from competitive swimming, with no perceptible return to competitions in the future.

Awards
 SwimSwam Swammy Award, NCAA Swimmer of the Year (male): 2019
 Swimming World, High School Swimmer of the Year (male): 2015
 SwimSwam Swammy Award, Age Group Swimmer of the Year 17—18 (male): 2014
 SwimSwam Swammy Award, Age Group Swimmer of the Year 15—16 (male): 2013
 SwimSwam Top 100 (Men's): 2021 (#49)

References

External links
 
 

1996 births
Living people
American male breaststroke swimmers
American male butterfly swimmers
American male medley swimmers
Thomas Jefferson High School for Science and Technology alumni
California Golden Bears men's swimmers
World Aquatics Championships medalists in swimming
Sportspeople from Charlotte, North Carolina
Swimmers at the 2020 Summer Olympics
Universiade medalists in swimming
Universiade gold medalists for the United States
Medalists at the 2015 Summer Universiade